Konstantin Yuryevich Nikolaev is Ukrainian-born, Russian billionaire businessman who is a co-owner of N-Trans and Globaltrans, the largest private rail operator in Russia, CIS, and the Baltic states. According to the Forbes, in 2019 Nikolaev's net worth was  estimated at $1.2 billion.

Description
He is a major investor in American Ethane and serves on its board. Late July 2018, his net worth was estimated at $1.2 billion. He allegedly is a financial supporter of Maria Butina. Through Igor Levitin, Alexey Mordashov, Arkady Rotenberg, Gennady Timchenko, and Alexander Voloshin, Konstantin Nikolaev is a partner and close associate of numerous persons in Vladimir Putin's inner circle.

In 1996, Nikolaev, Nikita Mishin, Andrei Filatov, and Alexey Mordashov formed Severstaltrans with Mordashov holding a 50% stake and the other three holding equal stakes of the remaining shares. In 1996, Igor Levitin became an employee of Severstaltrans and was the deputy director for transport engineering, rail transport and the operation of seaports from 1998 to 2004. In early 2008, Mordashov sold his 50% stake in Severstaltrans to Nikolaev, Mishin, and Filatov and then Severstaltrans changed its name to N-Trans. In 2008, 70% of Globaltrans shares were held by N-Trans. In 2008, 30% of the shares of Cypriot-based Globaltrans Investments Plc were offered as an IPO in July 2012 in London for $520 million.

While he was the Minister of Transport of the Russian Federation from May 20, 2004, to 2012, Igor Levitin ensured in 2010 that Mostotrest would construct the toll roads for the Russian federal highway network. According to Finance Magazine in February 2011, Nikolaev as co-owner of the N-Trans holding group was ranked 117 richest Russian with an estimated worth of $920 million which was nearly identical to his business partners Nikita Mishin ranked 116th worth an estimated $920 million and Andrey Filatov ranked 118th worth an estimated $920 million. In 2010, they each had an estimated worth of $690 million according to Finance magazine.

Late in 2011, Nikolaev and Mishin sold to Gennady Timchenko their 13% stake for $150–200 million in Transoil, which is one of the largest railway transporters of oil and oil products in Russia.

In 2014, Nikolaev, Mikhail Yuriev, Andrey Kunatbaev, Roman Abramovich, Alexander Abramov, and Alexander Voloshin became the majority investors in John Houghtaling II's American Ethane. After Roman Abramov divested his investment in American Ethane in April 2017, Nikolaev, Yuriev, and Kunatbaev became co-owners of American Ethane with a combined stake of 88%.

Before October 2014, Nikolaev and his investment partners owned a combined 31.55% stake and Arkady Rotenberg held the other 68.45% stake in Marc O'Polo Investments which held a 38.63% stake in the major road construction firm Mostotrest, but, in October 2014 after Rotenberg fell under international sanctions because of the Russian interference in Ukraine and Russian annexation of Crimea, Rotenberg transferred his stake to his son Igor. In April 2015, Marc O'Polo investments sold its stake in Mostotrest to NPF Blagosostoyanie.

Nikolaev, Mishin, and Filatov own 34.5% of Globaltrans (an 11.5% stake for each) but sold the stevedore and ports holding company assets, Global Ports, in December 2017. Sergey Shishkarev's Delo Group purchased the stakes of Nikolaev, Mishin, and Filatov in Global Ports which includes the management of the ports at the First Container Terminal, Petrolesport, Ust-Luga Container Terminal, and the Moby Dick in northwestern Russia; Eastern Stevedoring Company in the Far East; and two in Finland: the Multi-Link Helsinki and the Multi-Link Kotka.

Personal life
He is married, and has a son. His wife owns ORSIS, a Russian firearms company that supplies sniper rifles to the Russian National Guard. Konstantin Nikoleav was an investor in his wife's company. He also owns a wine estate in Bolgheri, Tuscany.

His son lives in the United States as a student and was a volunteer at Donald Trump's headquarters during his Presidential Campaign in 2016.

Notes

References 

1971 births
Ukrainian billionaires
Living people
Businesspeople from Dnipro
Russian billionaires